John Douglas Deshotel (born January 6, 1952) is an American prelate of the Roman Catholic Church who has been serving as bishop of the Diocese of Lafayette in Louisiana since 2016. He served as an auxiliary bishop of the Diocese of Dallas in Texas from 2010 to 2016.

Biography
John Deshotel was born on January 6, 1952, in Basile, Louisiana. He studied at Holy Trinity Seminary in Irving, Texas.

Deshotel was ordained a priest by Bishop Maurice Schexnayder on May 13, 1978, for the Diocese of Dallas. Deshotel was appointed as auxiliary bishop of the Diocese of Dallas as well as titular bishop of Cova on March 11, 2010, by Pope Benedict XVI. Deshotel was consecrated by Bishop Kevin Farrell on April 27, 2010.

Bishop of Lafayette in Louisiana
On February 17, 2016,  Deshotel was appointed bishop of the Diocese of Lafayette in Louisiana, succeeding Bishop Charles Jarrell. He was installed on April 15, 2016, in the Cathedral of St. John the Evangelist at Lafayette, Louisiana, by Archbishop Gregory Aymond.

See also
 
 Catholic Church hierarchy
 Catholic Church in the United States
 Historical list of the Catholic bishops of the United States
 List of Catholic bishops of the United States
 Lists of patriarchs, archbishops, and bishops
 Roman Catholic Diocese of Dallas

References

External links
Roman Catholic Diocese of Lafayette in Louisiana Official Site
Catholic-Hierarchy

1952 births
Living people
People from Basile, Louisiana
21st-century Roman Catholic bishops in the United States
Catholics from Louisiana